Enid Moodie Heddle (1904–1991) was an Australian poet, writer, editor and publisher for children who was born in Elsternwick, Victoria.

She attended Sydney Girls' High School, and graduated from the University of Melbourne with an MA. She then taught at schools in South Australia and Victoria, while also spending some time in England teaching and researching children's libraries.

In 1935 she joined the Longman publishing house and worked as an educational adviser to Longmans and Collins from 1935–1946. After the Second World War she was appointed as Education Manager, 1945-1960) and in that capacity oversaw the publication of textbooks for schools and universities.

Heddle published two collections of poetry and edited a number of books, with The Boomerang Book of Legendary Tales winning the Children's Book of the Year Award: Older Readers in 1957.

She published articles in Meanjin (1943, 1947, 1959) and Walkabout. She also edited the Australian editions of The Poet's Way (1942-1994), Discovering Poetry (1956-1957) and A Galaxy of Poems Old and New (1962).
 
She died in Glen Iris, Victoria in 1991.

Bibliography

Poetry collections 
 Solitude and Other Vagaries (1937)
 Sagita Says (1943)

Non-fiction 
 Story of a Vineyard - Chateau Tahbilk (1968)

Edited 
 Some Australian Adventurers (Longman, Greens and Co., 1944) short story anthology
 Action and Adventure : A Book of Australian Prose (1954)  short story anthology
 The Boomerang Book of Australian Poetry (1956) poetry anthology for children 
 The Boomerang Book of Legendary Tales (1957) fiction anthology for children 
 A Galaxy of Poems, Old and New (1962) edited with E. W. Parker, poetry anthology
 More Australian Adventurers (1970) short story anthology

References

1904 births
1991 deaths
20th-century Australian writers
Australian poets
Australian children's writers
Australian publishers (people)
Australian book editors
People educated at Sydney Girls High School
University of Melbourne alumni
Writers from Melbourne
People from Elsternwick, Victoria